Kottayam railway station is located in Kottayam, Kerala state, India. Kottayam railway station is managed by Southern Railway. Kottayam lies on the busy rail route between Thiruvananthapuram and Ernakulam. It is an NSG 3 category station. The station is served by several long-distance trains connecting most major cities in the country on a daily basis like New Delhi, Mumbai, Chennai, Bengaluru, Hyderabad, Coimbatore, Bhopal, Pune and Mangalore. Trains connecting extreme ends of india also passes through the station like Jammu tawi, Dibrugarh etc. It is one of the busiest station in Thiruvananthapuram central - Ernakulam route due to ease in accessibility of Sabarimala temple. Kottayam railway station is the halt station for passengers to Sabarimala temple, Vagamon, 
Kumarakom,  Illickal kallu - high range,  St. Alphonsa's tomb, Pala and so on. Station currently has 2 by-passing platforms - (1 & 2), and 3 terminal platforms (3,4 & 5). All platforms are able to accommodate locomotives with 24 coaches. Station is currently under construction of 1A Platform along with a new entrance. By completing double line from Chingavanam to Ettumanoor, southern railway has achieved its complete stretch of double rail line from Thiruvananthapuram to Mangalore

History
The works for the metre-gauge project between Ernakulam  and Kollam commenced on 24 December 1952. The metre-gauge railway line from Ernakulam to Kottayam was completed in 1956 and was formally inaugurated in October 1956. The metre-gauge line was later extended to Kollam on 1958 and was inaugurated on 6 January 1958.

Layout
Kottayam railway station has six platforms for handling long-distance and passenger trains. A railway goods shed was also situated at the station. It was torn down in 2019. The station is located at Nagampadam which is at a distance of 2.5 km from Kottayam town.

Significance
Kottayam railway station is the nearest railway station which caters to famous tourist destinations like Kumarakom. Kottayam railway station is also used by pilgrims going to Sabarimala temple though Chengannur is the hub of Sabarimala.
During Sabarimala pilgrim (Mandala) season, state transport bus operates from this station.

See also 
Ernakulam–Kottayam–Kayamkulam line
Chengannur railway station
Tiruvalla railway station
Changanasseri railway station
Thiruvananthapuram railway division
Punalur railway station

References

External links

Railway stations in Kottayam district
Thiruvananthapuram railway division